Mohan Markam is an Indian politician from Chhattisgarh, India and Chhattisgarh Pradesh Congress Committee president.  He is also a MLA from kondagaon constituency of Chhattisgarh.

References

External links 

Living people
Chhattisgarh politicians
1967 births
Chhattisgarh MLAs 2018–2023